Komárno District is a district in
the Nitra Region of western Slovakia. 
Until 1918, the district was mostly part of the Komárom county within the Kingdom of Hungary.

The district has a population of 108.556 of which 74.976 (69.1%) are Hungarians and 30.079 (27.7%) are Slovaks  (2001).

Municipalities

References 

 
Districts of Slovakia
Hungarian-speaking countries and territories
Geography of Nitra Region